"Nothing Really Matters" is a 1999 single by Madonna.

Nothing Really Matters may also refer to:

 "Nothing Really Matters" (Becky Hill and Tiësto song)
 "Nothing Really Matters" (Gabrielle Aplin song)
 "Nothing Really Matters" (Mr. Probz song)
 "Nothing Really Matters", a song by David Guetta featuring will.i.am from Nothing but the Beat